Animalada (English: Animal) is a 2001 Argentine black comedy film directed and written by Sergio Bizzio.

Main cast
 Carlos Roffé as Alberto
 Christina Banegas as Natalie
 Carolina Fal as Paula
 Walter Quiroz as Gaston
 José María Monje as Miranda

Other cast
 Federico Martin Barros ....  Bailarin 1
 Hilda Bernard ....  Aristocrat Lady
 Sergio Boris ....  Médico 2
 Silvina Bosco ....  Empleada Agncia de Turismo
 Nicolás Brown ....  Joven 2
 Osvaldo Burgos ....  Jorge
 Horacio Embón ....  Conductor
 Vilma Ferrán ....  Mamá Familia
 Alejandro Fornasari ....  Enfermero 1
 Facundo Galván ....  Silveyra
 Alfredo Iglesias ....  Director Psiquiátrico
 Roberto Jacoby ....  Efermero 2
 Carlos Lanari ....  Papa Familia
 Julio Marticorena ....  Médico 1
 Julieta Ortega
 Francisco Peterson ....  Bailarin 3
 Mariano Rey ....  Bailarin 2
 Guillermo Soffiantini ....  Policia 2
 Rafael Spregelburd ....  Ramiro
 Paolo Taramasco ....  Joven 1
 Antonio Ugo ....  Policia

Release
The film premiered in Argentina on 6 September 2001.

External links
 

2001 films
2000s Spanish-language films
2001 black comedy films
2001 comedy-drama films
2001 comedy films
Argentine black comedy films
2000s Argentine films